Bruce Chadwick Hugo (September 11, 1945 – January 4, 2017) was an American politician and member of the Oregon House of Representatives. He was a communications consultant.

He died on January 4, 2017.

References

1945 births
2017 deaths
Democratic Party members of the Oregon House of Representatives
Politicians from Portland, Oregon
People from Scappoose, Oregon